The Korean Movie Database (KMDb)  is a South Korean online database of information related to Korean movies, animation, actors, television shows, production crew personnel and other film-related information. KMDb launched in February 2006 by Korean Film Archive. While it was modeled after the American online commercial film archive, Internet Movie Database, the site is a public site.

See also
Cinema of Korea
Allmovie
Filmweb
FindAnyFilm.com
Rotten Tomatoes

References

External links

Official Website
Korean Movie Website

South Korean film websites
Internet properties established in 2006
Online film databases